BCS: 50 Years is a review volume edited by Leon Cooper, a 1972 Nobel Laureate in Physics, and Dmitri Feldman of Brown University, first published in 2010.

The book consists of 23 articles written by outstanding physicists, including many Nobel prize-winners, and presents the complete theory of superconductivity - a phenomenon where the electrical resistance of some metallic materials suddenly vanish at temperatures near absolute zero.

Background

Sixty years ago, in 1957, John Bardeen, Leon Cooper and John Robert Schrieffer finally pieced together the puzzle of superconductivity, explaining in detail its mechanism and the associated effects.  The BCS theory, named after the three scientists, won Professor Cooper the Nobel Prize in Physics in 1972, which he shared with John Robert Schrieffer and his teacher, John Bardeen.

Contents

Section 1: Historical Perspectives

The first section of the book describes important discoveries which led to the development of BCS theory.

 Chapter 1: "Remembrance of Superconductivity Past" by Leon N Cooper
 Chapter 2: "The Road to BCS" by John Robert Schrieffer
 Chapter 3: "Development of Concepts in Superconductivity" by John Bardeen
 Chapter 4: "Failed Theories of Superconductivity" by Jörg Schmalian
 Chapter 5: "Nuclear Magnetic Resonance and the BCS Theory" by Charles Pence Slichter
 Chapter 6: "Superconductivity: From Electron Interaction to Nuclear Superfluidity" by David Pines
 Chapter 7: "Developing BCS Ideas in the Former Soviet Union" by Lev P. Gor'kov
 Chapter 8: "BCS: The Scientific "Love of my Life"" by Philip Warren Anderson

Section 2: Fluctuations, Tunneling and Disorder

The second section focuses on quantum phenomena which occur in superconductors.

 Chapter 9: "SQUIDs: Then and Now" by John Clarke
 Chapter 10: "Resistance in Superconductors" by Bertrand I. Halperin, Gil Refael and Eugene Demler
 Chapter 11: "Cooper Pair Breaking" by Peter Fulde
 Chapter 12: "Superconductor-Insulator Transitions" by Allen M. Goldman
 Chapter 13: "Novel Phases of Vortices in Superconductors" by Pierre Le Doussal
 Chapter 14: "Breaking Translational Invariance by Population Imbalance: The Fulde-Ferrell-Larkin-Ovchinnikov States" by Gertrud Zwicknagl and Jochen Wosnitza

Section 3: New Superconductors

Section three of the book is on various experimental and theoretical methods used to identify new superconducting materials.

 Chapter 15: "Predicting and Explaining  and Other Properties of BCS Superconductor" by Marvin L. Cohen
 Chapter 16: "The Evolution of HTS: -Experiment Perspectives" by Paul Chu
 Chapter 17: "The Evolution of High-Temperature Superconductivity: Theory Perspective" by Elihu Abrahams

Section 4: BCS Beyond Superconductivity

The final section of the book is on the application of BCS theory beyond the field of superconductivity.

 Chapter 18: "The Superfluid Phases of Liquid 3He: BCS Theory" by Anthony James Leggett
 Chapter 19: "Superfluidity in a Gas of Strongly Interacting Fermions" by Wolfgang Ketterle, Y. Shin, André Schirotzek and C. H. Schunk
 Chapter 20: "BCS from Nuclei and Neutron Stars to Quark Matter and Cold Atoms" by Gordon Baym
 Chapter 21: "Energy Gap, Mass Gap, and Spontaneous Symmetry Breaking" by Yoichiro Nambu
 Chapter 22: "BCS as Foundation and Inspiration: The Transmutation of Symmetry" by Frank Wilczek
 Chapter 23: "From BCS to the LHC" by Steven Weinberg

Reception

John Swain writing for CERN Courier describes the book as a wonderful review of a powerful unifying concept which covers an enormous range of phenomena.  Malcolm Beasley for Physics Today adds that the book will provide any person curious about superconductivity with something to enjoy. In addition, Jermey Matthews, the book editor from Physics Today, had chosen BCS: 50 years as one of the five books to put on your 2011 holiday wish list.

Additional information

13 papers from the book have been published concurrently as a special issue of the International Journal of Modern Physics B.

See also
 Solid-state physics
 Charles Kittel
 David Mermin

References

Superconductivity
Physics books
2010 non-fiction books